And We Washed Our Weapons in the Sea is the fifth and final studio album by American post-hardcore band Frodus, which was released posthumously in 2001. The album received very positive feedback from critics and fans alike, and is considered as the band's best effort.

Background
The album was completed in 1999, and was recorded in a few months at Salad Days Studio. The band disbanded around that time and decided to make the record their last. However, due to struggles finding a proper label to release the record, its release-date was held back. During 2000, tracks from the album would leak onto file-sharing networks, such as Napster. The disc was intended to be released through MIA-Records, but the label shut down due to lawsuits the owner was dealing with at the time. It was not until Tony Weinbender, a long-time-friend of the band, signed them to Fueled by Ramen, that helped them release the record in early 2001.

The album is dedicated to Alanna Alindogan.

Track listing

Personnel

Performers
Shelby Cinca - Vocals, guitar, electronics
Jason Hamacher - Drums, percussion
Nathan Burke - Bass, vocals, keyboards

Production
Prof. Yaya - Layout
Nathan Burke - Photography
Shigeo Kikuchi - Photography
Anthony Childs - Photography
Brian McTernan - Production

References

External links
 
Frodus.com Official website
Frodus interview by Shelby Cinca for SHZine (November 2000).

2001 albums
Fueled by Ramen albums
Frodus albums
Albums produced by Brian McTernan